Sehjowal Chak No 11  (also Sehjowāl) is a village in Kasur District, Tehsil Pattoki, in the province of Punjab, Pakistan.

Personalities

.Haji Mian Inayat Ullah Sb (Late)
.Baba Shaer Muhammad Qadri (Late)
.Peer Syed Asghar Ali Shah (Late)
.DR.ALI IJAZ ASIM CHAUDHRY(Late)

Education
 Government High School For Boys( Outside of Village located at canal Road linked Road Chunia. 
 Government High School For Girls (Horrizentle Cross of Meelad Chowk Sehjowal  
 Nadeem Haider Model Middle school.
 The Cambridge Valley School(canal Road linked Road Chunia. 
 Iqra Model school.

Festivals

 Annual Mehfalee Melaad in Melaad Chowk(Every April of Year).
 Annual Jamat of DAUD Bandagi Kirmani on 12 March.
 Annual Mehfalee Samaa on 12 March( Late Night)
 Annual Fair of BABA Sheer Muhammad Qadri.
 Annual Qwali Of Fair at darbar shareef of Baba Sheer Muhammad Qadri (3–5 pm)

Sehjowal Railway Station
Distance: 11.6 miles / 18.6 km
Type: Railwaystation
Sehjowal railway station is located in Pakistan.

References

Populated places in Kasur District